Mason Peatling (born 31 March 1997) is an Australian professional basketball player for Melbourne United of the National Basketball League (NBL). He played college basketball for the Eastern Washington Eagles.

Early life
Peatling attended Beaconhills College near Melbourne, Australia. He played club basketball for the Dandenong Rangers in the South East Australian Basketball League and represented Victoria Metro at the Under-20 Australian Junior Basketball Championships. Peatling signed with Eastern Washington in November 2015.

College career
Peatling averaged 4 points and three rebounds per game as a freshman. He improved his averages to 7.7 points and 5.6 rebounds per game as a sophomore. As a junior, Peatling averaged 15.5 points and 7.5 rebounds per game. He was named to the Second Team All-Big Sky. On 13 December 2019, he scored a Big Sky-record 54 points and had 13 rebounds during a 146-89 win over Multnomah University. Peatling was named Big Sky Player of the Year as a senior. He averaged 17.2 points and 9.1 rebounds per game as the Eagles' second-leading scorer behind Jacob Davison.

Professional career

Melbourne United (2020–present)
On 24 July 2020, Peatling signed a three-year deal with Melbourne United of the National Basketball League (NBL), with the first season as a development player.

Personal life
Peatling earned his finance degree in under four years at Eastern Washington. He married Laura Burdack, who also played club basketball, in 2016. Her brother Blake was a teammate of Peatling on a travelling club team.

References

External links
Eastern Washington Eagles bio
College Statistics at Sports-Reference.com

1997 births
Living people
Australian expatriate basketball people in the United States
Australian men's basketball players
Eastern Washington Eagles men's basketball players
Melbourne United players
Power forwards (basketball)
Basketball players from Melbourne